The Indianapolis mayoral election of 1955 took place on November 8, 1955 and saw the election of Philip L. Bayt to a second non-consecutive term. Bayt's opponent was Republican James O. Birr.

Results

References

1955
1955 United States mayoral elections
1955 Indiana elections